McCombie is a surname. Notable people with the surname include:

Andy McCombie (1876–1952), Scottish international footballer
Karen McCombie (born 1963), author of children and young adult novels
William McCombie (1805–1880), Scottish agriculturist famed for a herd of black-polled cattle

See also
Barton–McCombie deoxygenation, organic reaction replacing a hydroxy group with hydrogen to give an alkyl group